Ballymore Novices' Hurdle may refer to:

Baring Bingham Novices' Hurdle, a horse race at Cheltenham Racecourse in March
Classic Novices' Hurdle, a horse race at Cheltenham Racecourse in January
Hyde Novices' Hurdle, a horse race at Cheltenham Racecourse in November
Leamington Novices' Hurdle, a horse race at Warwick Racecourse
Winter Novices' Hurdle, a horse race at Sandown Park Racecourse